USS Juniper was a steamer acquired by the Union Navy during the American Civil War. She was used by the Union Navy as a tugboat in support of the Union Navy blockade of Confederate waterways.

Service history

Juniper was purchased at New York City from Solomon Thomas 7 June 1864; and commissioned at New York Navy Yard 11 July 1864. Juniper sailed for Washington, D.C. via Hampton Roads, Virginia, arriving at the Washington Navy Yard 17 July 1864. Two days later she was attached to the Potomac River Flotilla where she served during the remainder of the war performing varied duties as a tug, dispatch vessel, and patrol ship. She sailed from the lower Potomac River 5 May 1865 for the Washington Navy Yard, where she decommissioned 26 May. Juniper was sold to the U.S. Treasury Department for service under the Lighthouse Board 29 June 1865.

References 

Ships of the Union Navy
American Civil War patrol vessels of the United States
Steamships of the United States Navy
Tugs of the United States Navy
Dispatch boats of the United States Navy